Paul Junior Medford is a British actor. He is best known for playing the role of Kelvin Carpenter in the BBC soap opera EastEnders from the show's inception in 1985 to 1987. He has since appeared in numerous West End musicals, including a long stage show Five Guys Named Moe.

Early life 
Medford is from Ealing, West London and is of Barbadian descent. He attended the Barbara Speake Stage School and the Italia Conti Academy for ten years.

Career
Medford appeared in several feature films and television programmes, including Return of the Saint (1978) and The Professionals (1983).

In 1985 Medford became one of the original cast of the BBC's new soap opera, EastEnders. He played Kelvin, the son of Tony Carpenter (Oscar James), for over two years. During his stint on EastEnders Medford managed minor musical chart success with fellow "EastEnder" Letitia Dean, who played Sharon Watts. A song penned for the pair as part of a plotline in the show prompted them to release a single entitled "Something Outa Nothing", which made number 12 in the UK singles chart in November 1986.

Kelvin was one of the more popular characters in the show's early years and Medford remained in the serial following the departures of all of his on-screen family. He eventually quit the role in 1987 in order to follow his ambition of becoming a singer/dancer.

Medford is a trained singer with a "high baritone" range and his dancing repertoire includes tap, ballet, jazz, contemporary and Latin. Following his departure from EastEnders, Medford found success on stage. He has appeared in several West End musicals, including The Lion King as Banzai the Hyena; as Little Mo in Five Guys Named Moe; as Fitzroy in The Queen And I and as Hud in Hair among others. Medford earned a Laurence Olivier Award nomination in 1991 for Best Actor in the Musical Five Guys Named Moe and in 1995 he received the Society of Black Arts Achievement Award.

He played Mr. Beauregarde in Charlie and the Chocolate Factory the Musical at Drury Lane in May 2013.

Medford's other television credits include: This Life (1997), Invasion: Earth (1998); Casualty (2003) and as the presenter 'Blake Wordsworth' in the children's BBC programme The Story Makers (2004).

Medford was nominated for Best Supporting Actor in a Musical by whatsonstage.com in 2010.

In June 2019, Medford was named Vice President of Unscripted, Current Series at Nickelodeon.

References

Bibliography
 Holmstrom, John. The Moving Picture Boy: An International Encyclopaedia from 1895 to 1995. Norwich, Michael Russell, 1996, p. 369.

External links 

Agency Profile

Living people
Alumni of the Italia Conti Academy of Theatre Arts
BBC Records artists
Black British male actors
English male child actors
English male musical theatre actors
English male soap opera actors
English people of Barbadian descent
Male actors from London
People from the London Borough of Ealing
Year of birth missing (living people)